Odd Strand (21 August 1925 – 18 May 2008) was a Norwegian civil servant.

He was born in Aure, but grew up in Trondheim. During the German occupation of Norway he was a member of Milorg. He later studied at the University of Oslo, graduating as cand.philol. and later magister in political science in 1953.

He started a career in government ministries and agencies, and was appointed director of the Norwegian Central Information Service upon its creation in 1965. He remained director until 1993, when he reached the age limit. He was succeeded by Arne Simonsen. Statens Informasjonstjeneste no longer exists, as it was merged into Statskonsult in 2001.

References

1925 births
2008 deaths
Directors of government agencies of Norway
People from Aure, Norway
People from Trondheim
Norwegian resistance members
University of Oslo alumni